The 1978–79 Scottish Cup was the 94th staging of Scotland's most prestigious football knockout competition. The Cup was won by Rangers who defeated Hibernian in the twice replayed final.

First round

Replays

Second round

Replays

Third round

Replays

Fourth round

Replays

Quarter-finals

Replay

Semi-finals

Replay

Final

Replay

Second Replay

Events

Inverness Thistle's match against Falkirk became famous in Scotland due to the fact that the game was postponed 29 times, It was originally supposed to be played on 6 January in Inverness at Kingsmills Park due to ice and snow, and was eventually played on 22 February once it was deemed suitable, where Falkirk won the game 4-0, and were eventually put out by Dundee 3 days later, though it was a few postponements short of beating the record of 33 games by Airdrieonians and Stranraer set 16 years earlier due to similar circumstances during the Winter of 1962–63 in the United Kingdom where football matches were called off due to snowstorms.

See also
1978–79 in Scottish football
1978–79 Scottish League Cup

References

Scottish Cup seasons
1978–79 in Scottish football
Scot